The following is a list of episodes of the French television series R.I.S, police scientifique.

Season 1 features 8 episodes, Season 2 features 12 episodes, Season 3 features 10 episodes, Season 4 and 5 features 16 episodes, Season 6 features 12 episodes while Season 7 features 8 episodes, season 8 features 12 episodes.

Series overview

Episodes

Season 1 (2006)

Season 2 (2007)

Season 3 (2008)

Season 4 (2008−09)

Season 5 (2009−10)

Season 6 (2010−11)

Season 7 (2012)

Season 8 (2013)

Season 9 (2014)

External links
 

R.I.S, police scientifique